Maria Dunin (5 May 1899 – 6 August 1986) was a Polish painter. Her work was part of the painting event in the art competition at the 1928 Summer Olympics.

References

1899 births
1986 deaths
20th-century Polish painters
Polish women painters
Olympic competitors in art competitions
People from Kamianets-Podilskyi
20th-century Polish women